Pezizomycotina make up most of the Ascomycota fungi and include most lichenized fungi too. Pezizomycotina contains the filamentous ascomycetes and is a subdivision of the Ascomycota (fungi that form their spores in a sac-like ascus). It is more or less synonymous with the older taxon Euascomycota. These fungi reproduce by fission rather than budding and this subdivision includes almost all the ascus fungi that have fruiting bodies visible to the naked eye (exception: genus Neolecta, which belongs to the Taphrinomycotina).

See the taxobox for a list of the classes that make up the Pezizomycotina. The old class Loculoascomycetes (consisting of all the bitunicate Ascomycota) has been replaced by the two classes Eurotiomycetes and Dothideomycetes. The rest of the Pezizomycotina also include the previously defined hymenial groups Discomycetes (now Leotiomycetes) and Pyrenomycetes (Sordariomycetes).

Some important groups in Pezizomycotina include: Pezizomycetes (the operculate discomycetes), Leotiomycetes (the inoperculate discomycetes), Laboulbeniomycetes, Sordariomycetes, Dothideomycetes.

Paleopyrenomycites from the Early Devonian Rhynie Chert is the oldest known fossil member of Pezizomycotina, although its position within this subdivision is unclear.

References

External links
 
 
 Tree of Life – Pezizomycotina
 The Pezizomycotina, Paleos

 
Opisthokont subphyla